Akot Assembly constituency is one of the 288 constituencies of Maharashtra Vidhan Sabha and one of the five which are located in the Akola district.

It is a part of the Akola (Lok Sabha constituency) along with five other assembly constituencies, viz Balapur, Akola West, and Akola East, Murtizapur (SC) and Risod  from Washim district.

As per orders of Delimitation of Parliamentary and Assembly constituencies Order, 2008, No. 28 Akot Assembly constituency is composed of the following: 
1. Telhara Tehsil, 2. Akot Tehsil (Part), Revenue Circle- Umara, Panaj, Akot and Akot (MC). of Akola district.

Members of Legislative Assembly

See also
Telhara
Akot
Umara
Panaj

Notes

Assembly constituencies of Maharashtra